.

Kuruva is a small village in Malappuram district, Kerala, India.  It falls under Mankada (State Assembly constituency).

References

Suburbs of Malappuram